Arlene Vaughan is a fictional character from the ABC soap opera All My Children. The character was originated by actress Phyllis Lyons. She portrayed the role from 1990 to 1993. Olivia Birkelund, most identified in the role, took over the role in 1995 and portrayed it from April 1995 to September 1995. She then returned to the role again in 2000, 2001, and finally 2002.

Storylines
Arlene Vaughan comes to Pine Valley hot on the heels of her runaway daughter, Hayley. In Pine Valley, Hayley discovers that her biological father is Adam Chandler, though she was raised to believe different. Arlene is an alcoholic, and one night after she drinks and drives, she crashes into a car being driven by Jackson Montgomery, with a pregnant Brooke English inside.

Arlene's other habit is being attracted to her daughter's boyfriends and husbands. She and Alec McIntyre, Hayley's then-husband, have a one-night stand, or so Alec thinks. Arlene blackmails him into more sex. She decides to tell Hayley the truth about her and Alec, but Alec insists on one more night. That night, instead of sex, Alec pours alcohol down Arlene's throat, saying to her that every time he had sex with her, it disgusted him. Hayley witnesses this and Alec is eventually sent to jail for trying to kill Arlene through alcohol poisoning. Arlene soon leaves town afterward.

She makes several more trips back to Pine Valley, however, much to the dismay of her daughter. In 2000, she begins drinking again and gets behind the wheel of a car, crashing into Stuart Chandler. Arlene marries Stuart's twin brother, Adam, and ends up pregnant by him, but miscarries the baby, and Adam soon divorces her.

Hayley and Mateo Santos have a child in 2001. Determined to see her new grandson, little Enzo, Arlene steals a lock of his hair. Hayley wants nothing to do with her, however, so she quickly leaves town, abandoning her plan to kidnap Enzo.

Further reading
 De Foe, James R., and Warren Breed. "Consulting with Media for Health Education: Some New Directions." Education Resources Information Center August  1991. Web. 27 February  2012 <http://eric.ed.gov/PDFS/ED340072.pdf>.
 Reichardt, Nancy M. "Role of alcoholic fulfilling for Lyons." Austin American-Statesman [Austin, TX] 20 October  1991: 50. Web. 27 February  2012. 
 Reichardt, Nancy M. "Role of alcoholic takes a toll." TV Star – The Free Lance–Star [Fredericksburg, VA] 28 September  1991: 2+. Google News. Web. 27 February  2012 <https://news.google.com/newspapers?id=yPdNAAAAIBAJ&sjid=OosDAAAAIBAJ&pg=5691%2C4620487>.
 Sloan, Kathleen. "Soap roles dropping like falling leaves." Toronto Star 8 October  1995: B6. Web. 27 February  2012 <https://pqasb.pqarchiver.com/thestar/access/21265235.html?FMT=ABS>.

External links
  Arlene Vaughan's biography at soapcentral.com

Vaughan, Arlene
Fictional bartenders
Television characters introduced in 1990
Female characters in television
Fictional bookmakers